Kamil al-Husayni (also spelled Kamel al-Hussaini; 23 February 1867 – 31 March 1921) was a Sunni Muslim religious leader in Palestine and member of the al-Husayni family. He was the Hanafi Mufti of Jerusalem from 1908, and in 1918 the British Mandate authorities appointed him as the first "Grand Mufti of Jerusalem", a title they had copied from the Grand Mufti of Egypt. The British referred to him as "the representative of Islam in Palestine and a member of the oldest nobility of the country".

Al-Husayni was the son of Mohammed Tahir al-Husayni, who had preceded him as Hanafi Mufti of Jerusalem.

Politically, his approach was very different from his father's. During the British Mandate for Palestine, he sought compromise with the Jews and British authorities. The British appointed him chairman of the Appeal Courts and later director of the Higher Waqf Committee. The British also made him a Companion of the Order of St Michael and St George (CMG).

He was succeeded by his brother Mohammad Amin al-Husayni.

References

Bibliography
 
Zvi Elpeleg (1992, David Harvey, trans.). The Grand Mufti : Haj Amin al-Hussaini, Founder of the Palestinian National Movement (London: Frank Cass)

External links
Palestinian Personalities: Al-Husseini, Kamel

Arabs in Ottoman Palestine
Grand Muftis of Jerusalem
Palestinian judges
Palestinian Sunni Muslims
Palestinian scholars of Islam
Sharia judges
Kamil
1882 births
1921 deaths
20th-century Palestinian people